The Machlin Women's Swiss Teams North American bridge championship is held at the spring American Contract Bridge League (ACBL) North American Bridge Championship (NABC).

The Machlin Women's Swiss Teams is a four-session Swiss Teams event with two qualifying and two final sessions. The event typically starts on the second Saturday of the NABC. The event is only open to female players.

The event was dropped from the ACBL calendar effective 2018 and replaced with a two-day pairs event.

History

The Machlin Women's Swiss Teams competition is a two-day event with two qualifying sessions, followed by two final sessions. Scoring is by International Match Points (IMPs) converted to Victory Points (VPs). The event began in 1982 and was originally named the North American Women's Swiss Teams.

The winners are awarded the Machlin Trophy, donated by the Machlin family in memory of Sadie Machlin, longtime ACBL employee. She was the sister of ACBL chief tournament director Al Sobel and the mother of Jerry Machlin, national tournament director.

Winners

No Women's Swiss champion team has defended its title successfully and it has not been common for pairs or single players to win consecutively.

References

Sources

 List of previous winners, Page 5. 

 2009 winners, Page 1. 

 "Search Results: Machlin Women's Swiss Teams". 1982 to present. ACBL. Visit "NABC Winners"; select a Spring NABC. Retrieved 2014-06-04. 

North American Bridge Championships